Komvophoron is a genus of cyanobacteria belonging to the family Borziaceae.

The genus has almost cosmopolitan distribution.

Species:

Komvophoron epiphyticum 
Komvophoron minutum 
Komvophoron pallildum 
Komvophoron schmidlei 
Komvophoron siderophilum

References

Oscillatoriales
Cyanobacteria genera